Joseph McDonald Farm is a historic home and farm complex located near Prices Fork, Montgomery County, Virginia.  The main house is a two-story, three bay, modified hall and parlor plan, log dwelling.  The original section dates to about 1800.  A two-story rear ell was added in the mid-19th century, and an addition to the ell was added in 1908. Also on the property are the contributing log spring house, one-story log house, and a board-and-batten outbuilding.

It was listed on the National Register of Historic Places in 1991.

References

Houses on the National Register of Historic Places in Virginia
Farms on the National Register of Historic Places in Virginia
Houses completed in 1800
Houses in Montgomery County, Virginia
National Register of Historic Places in Montgomery County, Virginia